Bunyip railway station is located on the Gippsland line in Victoria, Australia. It serves the town of Bunyip, and opened on 8 October 1877.

The remains of a former goods and stock platform and a crane are opposite the single platform. The siding for the platform was removed in April 1988.

The track up to the western (up) end of the station was duplicated in 1956, but the section from Bunyip to Longwarry remains as single track, due to the need to duplicate the bridge over the Bunyip River. The line through Bunyip was electrified in July 1954, but the electrification was switched off between Bunyip and Warragul in December 1998, and between Pakenham and Bunyip in 2005, as part of the Regional Fast Rail project. A substation and a short section of the overhead wiring, both of which are listed on the Victorian Heritage Register, have been retained to the west of the station.

On 26 August 1988, the electric staff system between Bunyip and Longwarry was abolished, and was replaced with automatic three-position signalling. The signal box, interlocking, and all two-position signals, were also abolished.

The station was de-staffed on 26 May 1991.

As part of the Regional Rail Revival project, a second platform will be provided at the station, and the line duplicated between Bunyip and Longwarry. The project is to be completed in late 2022. However, it was reported in May 2022, that the duplication of the Bunyip-Longwarry track would not go ahead.

Platforms and services
Bunyip has one platform. It is served by V/Line Traralgon and selected Bairnsdale line trains.

Platform 1:
 services to Traralgon, Bairnsdale and Southern Cross

Transport links

Warragul Bus Lines operates one route via Bunyip station, under contract to Public Transport Victoria:
Garfield station – Traralgon Plaza

References

External links

Victorian Railway Stations Gallery
Melway map

Railway stations in Australia opened in 1877
Regional railway stations in Victoria (Australia)
Listed railway stations in Australia
Railway stations in the Shire of Cardinia